The 71st Annual Tony Awards were held on June 11, 2017, to recognize achievement in Broadway productions during the 2016–17 season. The ceremony was held at Radio City Music Hall in New York City, and was broadcast live by CBS. Kevin Spacey served as host.

The musical Natasha, Pierre & The Great Comet of 1812 led the nominations with 12, while the play with the most nominations was A Doll's House, Part 2, with eight. At the ceremony, Dear Evan Hansen won six awards, including Best Musical, becoming the production with the most wins of the season. 23-year-old Ben Platt, who played the title character, became the youngest solo winner for Best Actor in a Leading Role in a Musical. 21-year-old Eva Noblezada received her first nomination for Best Actress in a Leading Role in a Musical for her Broadway debut as Kim in Miss Saigon, becoming one of the youngest nominees in Best Actress in a Musical category. The Bette Midler-led revival of Hello, Dolly! won four awards, and The Great Comet won two. The productions of plays Indecent, The Little Foxes, and Oslo each won two awards.

The ceremony received mixed reviews, with many criticizing the performance of Spacey as host. Due to the sexual misconduct allegations against Spacey, the producers announced that it would not be submitted for the 70th Primetime Emmy Awards. However, the show did receive a nomination for Outstanding Lighting Design / Lighting Direction for a Variety Special.

Eligibility
Shows that opened on Broadway during the 2016–2017 season before April 27, 2017, were eligible for consideration.

Original plays
A Doll's House, Part 2
The Encounter
Heisenberg
Indecent
Oh, Hello
Oslo
The Play That Goes Wrong
The Present
Significant Other
Sweat

Original musicals
Amélie
Anastasia
Bandstand
A Bronx Tale
Charlie and the Chocolate Factory
Come from Away
Dear Evan Hansen
Groundhog Day
Holiday Inn
In Transit
Natasha, Pierre & The Great Comet of 1812
Paramour
War Paint

Play revivals
The Cherry Orchard
The Front Page
The Glass Menagerie
Jitney
Les Liaisons Dangereuses
The Little Foxes
Present Laughter
The Price
Six Degrees of Separation

Musical revivals
Cats
Falsettos
Hello, Dolly!
Miss Saigon
Sunset Boulevard

Notes
 Though the revival of Sunday in the Park with George would be technically eligible for the year's Tony Awards season, its producers elected to withdraw the show in advance from Tony consideration.

Awards events

Nominations
The Tony Award nominations were announced on May 2, 2017, by Jane Krakowski and Christopher Jackson.

The musical Natasha, Pierre & The Great Comet of 1812 garnered 12 nominations, becoming the most-nominated show of the season. The revival of Hello, Dolly! earned 10 nominations, the musical Dear Evan Hansen earned nine, and the new play A Doll's House, Part 2 earned eight. New musicals Come from Away and Groundhog Day each earned seven nominations, as did the new play Oslo.

Other events
The annual Meet the Nominees Press Reception took place on May 3, 2017, at the Sofitel New York Hotel. The annual Nominees Luncheon took place on May 23, 2017, at the Rainbow Room. A cocktail party was held on June 5, 2017, at the Sofitel New York Hotel to celebrate the season's Tony Honors for Excellence in the Theatre and Special Award recipients.

Ceremony

Presenters
The ceremony's presenters included:

 Rachel Bloom – backstage presenter
 Scarlett Johansson – presented Best Featured Actor in a Play
 Ron Duguay – introduced Come from Away
 Scott Bakula and Sutton Foster – presented Best Featured Actor in a Musical
 Lea Salonga and Jon Jon Briones  – introduced Miss Saigon
 Tom Sturridge and Olivia Wilde – presented Best Featured Actress in a Play
 Whoopi Goldberg – introduced Falsettos
 Cynthia Erivo and John Legend – presented Best Original Score 
 Anna Kendrick – introduced Dear Evan Hansen
 Sally Field – special presentation on the Tonys history
 David Oyelowo and Sarah Paulson – presented Best Actor in a Play
 Kevin Spacey (as Johnny Carson) – introduced Groundhog Day
 Tommy Tune – introduced Hello, Dolly!
 Bette Midler – presented Best Actress in a Play
 Patina Miller and Sara Bareilles – presented Best Featured Actress in a Musical
 Nick Kroll and John Mulaney – introduced The Rockettes performance
 Allison Janney and Christopher Jackson – presented Best Direction of a Play and Best Direction of a Musical
 Uma Thurman – introduced War Paint
 Josh Gad – presented Excellence in Theatre Education Award
 Orlando Bloom – presented Best Revival of a Play
 Keegan-Michael Key – introduced Natasha, Pierre & The Great Comet of 1812
 John Lithgow – presented Best Play
 Jill Biden – introduced Bandstand
 Jonathan Groff and Brian d'Arcy James – presenters of the Creative Arts winners
 Stephen Colbert – presented Best Revival of a Musical
 Mark Hamill – presenter of the In Memoriam tribute
 Tina Fey – presented Best Actor in a Musical
 Glenn Close – presented Best Actress in a Musical
 Lin-Manuel Miranda – presented Best Musical

Performances
The following shows and performers performed on the ceremony's telecast:

"Broadway Bound" – Kevin Spacey
"Welcome to the Rock" – Come from Away
"I'd Give My Life for You" / "Exodus" – Miss Saigon
"A Day in Falsettoland" – Falsettos
"Waving Through a Window" – Dear Evan Hansen
"Seeing You" – Groundhog Day
"Penny in My Pocket" – Hello, Dolly!
"Theme from New York, New York" – Cynthia Erivo, Leslie Odom Jr., and The Rockettes
"Face to Face" – War Paint
"Dust and Ashes" / "The Abduction" – Natasha, Pierre & The Great Comet of 1812
"Nobody" – Bandstand
"It's So Hard to Say Goodbye to Yesterday" – Justin Guarini, Kevin Smith Kirkwood, Okieriete Onaodowan, David Abeles, and Chuck Cooper
"The Curtain Falls" – Kevin Spacey and Patti LuPone

Non-competitive awards
The 2017 Tony Honors for Excellence were awarded to general managers Nina Lannan and Alan Wasser. Actor James Earl Jones received the season's Special Tony Award for Lifetime Achievement. The 2017 Isabelle Stevenson Award was awarded to Baayork Lee, "for her commitment to future generations of artists through her work with the National Asian Artists Project and theatre education programs around the world." A special Tony Award for Sound Design  was awarded to Gareth Fry and Pete Malkin for The Encounter, following the removal of the competitive sound design awards in 2014. The season's Excellence in Theatre Education Award was awarded to drama teacher Rachel Harry of Hood River Valley High School in Hood River, OR.

Winners and nominees
Sources: Playbill; The New York Times

∞ This marks Greenwood's 21st Tony Award nomination and first competitive win.

‡ The award is presented to the producer(s) of the musical or play.

Awards and nominations per production

Individuals with multiple nominations
 3: Dave Malloy
 2: Irene Sankoff and David Hein; Santo Loquasto

Reception
The show received a mixed reception from media publications. On Metacritic, the ceremony has a weighted average score of 53 out of 100, based on 6 reviews, indicating "mixed or average reviews". The Hollywood Reporter columnist David Rooney remarked, "Spacey is a brilliant actor, but warmth and humility are perhaps not his strongest suits. So opening on the defensive, with a messy mashup of songs from current-season musicals that he repurposed to head off any eventual criticism of his hosting performance, started the show on a strained note." The New York Times theatre critic Neil Genzlinger commented, "Sunday night's broadcast of Broadway's annual celebration of itself had trouble figuring out what to do with Kevin Spacey, the evening's host, making use of him in ways that ranged from torturous (the opening number) to tolerable (he does pretty good Johnny Carson and Bill Clinton impressions). It fared far better when it was about the work being honored and the people who did it." Cynthia Littleton from Variety wrote, "The biggest shortcoming was host Kevin Spacey, who just didn't deliver the same kind of engaging effort as his recent predecessors. The contrast was especially sharp against last year's emcee."

The Guardian columnist Alexis Soloski wrote, "The House of Cards actor offered outdated Johnny Carson impressions, a Bobby Darin number and a misfiring gag about Hillary Clinton's emails on a night of occasional shock and unforgivable schtick." IndieWire theatre critic Charles Isherwood commented, "Full of allusions to previous hosts (Neil Patrick Harris, James Corden, Hugh Jackman), it seemed to drag on forever — and was not particularly enlivened by guest appearances by Stephen Colbert and Whoopi Goldberg. Perhaps funny to those in the know, it could only have been mystifying to a wider audience." In addition, television critic Robert Lloyd of the Los Angeles Times remarked, "Kevin Spacey was the somewhat surprising — though certainly not unqualified — host of the 71st running of the Broadway theater-honoring Tony Awards, broadcast Sunday night from New York's Radio City Music Hall."

Ratings
The ceremony averaged a Nielsen 4.7 ratings/11 share, and was watched by 6 million viewers. The ratings was a 31 percent decrease from previous ceremony's viewership of 8.7 million, becoming the lowest since 2012.

In Memoriam
Broadway actors Justin Guarini, Kevin Smith Kirkwood, Okieriete Onaodowan, David Abeles, and Chuck Cooper performed Boyz II Men's "It's So Hard to Say Goodbye to Yesterday" as images of theatre personalities who died in the past year were shown in the following order.

Carrie Fisher
Dick Latessa
George S. Irving
Glenne Headly
Tammy Grimes
Garry Marshall
Fyvush Finkel
Gordon Davidson
Edward Albee
Willa Kim
 Seth Gelblum
Sheila Bond
 Cecilia Hart Jones
James Houghton
Martha Lavey
William M. Hoffman
Zelda Fichandler
 Irene Bunis
Laurie Carlos
Jack Hofsiss
Mary Tyler Moore
Martha Swope
Debbie Reynolds
John McMartin
Gene Wilder
Florence Henderson
Michael Gardner
 Karen Walsh
Alec McCowen
 Elliot Martin
William David Brohn
Edwin Sherin
Fritz Weaver
Rick Steiner
James M. Nederlander

See also
 Drama Desk Awards
 2017 Laurence Olivier Awards – equivalent awards for West End theatre productions
 Obie Award
 New York Drama Critics' Circle
 Theatre World Award
 Lucille Lortel Awards

References

External links
 

2017 awards in the United States
2017 in New York City
2010s in Manhattan
2017 theatre awards
June 2017 events in the United States
Tony Awards ceremonies
Television shows directed by Glenn Weiss